Claude Mariétan (born 17 September 1953) is a Swiss former professional footballer who played as a defender. He last worked as head coach of Monthey.

Career
Marietan started his senior career with Servette in the Nationalliga A, where he made three league appearances and scored zero goals. After that, he played for CS Chênois.

References

External links 
 Four French-speaking coaches 
 An exceptional pool 
 Corruption and a sense of celebration 
 Marabouts and susceptibility 
 Claude Mariétan: “Play! The rest doesn't count”
 Claude Mariétan: "African football is constantly alive with emotion" 
 Claude Mariétan, the Swiss “sorcerer”

1953 births
Living people
Swiss men's footballers
Association football defenders
Swiss Super League players
Servette FC players
CS Chênois players
Swiss football managers
FC Sion non-playing staff
Footballers from Geneva